Replication may refer to:

Science
 Replication (scientific method), one of the main principles of the scientific method, a.k.a. reproducibility
 Replication (statistics), the repetition of a test or complete experiment
 Replication crisis
 Self-replication, the process in which an entity (a cell, virus, program, etc.) makes a copy of itself
 DNA replication or DNA synthesis, the process of copying a double-stranded DNA molecule
 Semiconservative replication, mechanism of DNA replication
 Viral replication, the process by which viruses produce copies of themselves
 Replication (metallography), the use of thin plastic films to duplicate the microstructure of a component
 Self-replicating machines

Computing
 Replication (computing), the use of redundant resources to improve reliability, fault-tolerance, or performance
 Replication (optical media), the manufacture of CDs and DVDs by means other than burning writable discs

See also
 Replicator (disambiguation)